Guido Martín Kaczka (born 2 February 1978) is an Argentine actor, television presenter, television producer and radio host.

Biography 
Guido Kaczka was born in Moreno, Buenos Aires on February 2, 1978, and grew up in the Buenos Aires districts of Villa Luro and La Paternal.

Personal life 
On December 2, 2006, Kaczka married actress Florencia Bertotti, whom he had met while recording the Argentine telenovela Verano del '98. On July 10, 2008, the couple's first child, who they named Romeo Kaczka Bertotti, was born in the Clínica Maternidad Suizo Argentina. The couple divorced in March 2010. They share custody of their son. 

On November 25, 2014, his second child was born, a boy who they
named Benjamín Kaczka. On March 14, 2017 his third child, a girl, was born, who they named Helena Kaczka. On April 7, 2018 he married Soledad Rodríguez in a civil ceremony. On June 2, 2021, his fourth child was born, a boy who they named Eliseo Kaczka.

Career 

At age 5, Guido Kaczka began to attend a studio, accompanying his sister Analía and his brother Emiliano, who participated in Pelito. After singing tangos for the producer, he was selected to act in a telecomedy on TV Pública. At age 7 he debuted in theater, in the children's play La pandilla aventurera. 

In 2003, Kaczka was cast as the protagonist of the youth television series Rincón de luz with Soledad Pastorutti. In 2004, he was one of the main protagonists of the television series Los pensionados. From 2005 to 2009, he hosted an entertainment program in which two teams of students compete for a graduate trip to Bariloche, called El último pasajero. 

In 2009, Kaczka led the first production of his production company Kaberplay, the youth television series Niní. His wife Florencia Bertotti was the protagonist of the show. In 2010, he was chosen by Telefe to be the host of a new entertainment program called Alto juego. In 2011, he began with a new program following the theme of El último pasajero called Bariló, a todo o nada. In 2014, he began working for the first time on the radio, conducting a program called No está todo dicho with Claudia Fontán and Luciana Geuna on the famous radio station La 100. At first, the program was broadcast in the early morning, but after the arrival of Santiago del Moro with El Club del Moro, Guido Kakzca went on to occupy the strip from 9 to 13, changing the dynamics and format of the program.

Filmography

Television

Television Programs

Movies

Awards and nominations

References

External links

1978 births
Living people
Argentine Jews
Argentine television producers
Argentine radio producers
Argentine television presenters
Argentine people of Polish-Jewish descent
Argentine people of Polish descent
Jewish Argentine male actors
People from Buenos Aires